Kobiaantkari is a village in Georgia, situated in the Dusheti Municipality, Mtskheta-Mtianeti region, in about 1 km south from town Dusheti.

Name of the village is derived from surname "Kobiashvili" and Georgian word "kari" (means "household" ). Originally this village was landed property of Kobiashvili family.

Notable people
George Papashvily - a famous Georgian-American writer and sculptor

See also 
 Dusheti Municipality
 Dusheti
 Mtskheta-Mtianeti

Villages in Mtskheta-Mtianeti